Thomas Patrick Gleeson (1889-1931) was an Australian rugby league footballer from the 1910s.

Former Glebe centre Tom Gleeson also had a long career with Huddersfield Giants in England where he partnered the legendary Albert Rosenfeld.  "Australian Tommy Gleeson, signed in November 1912 from the Glebe club in Sydney, just three months before protests from the New South Wales Rugby League resulted in a ban on overseas players - a ban which was effective for fourteen years."

He did not return to Australia until after the first world war and played one final season with Glebe in 1923.

Tragic death

Tom Gleeson died in very tragic circumstances when he dived in the ocean from rocks near La Perouse, New South Wales to save his son Martin (aged 12) who had already been washed off the rocks while fishing. Tom Gleeson drowned soon after, and his son also drowned .

References

Australian rugby league players
Glebe rugby league players
Rugby league centres
1889 births
1931 deaths

Huddersfield Giants players